The Intercollegiate Horse Shows Association (IHSA) is a nonprofit organization composed of men and women of all riding levels and offers individual and team competition in hunter seat equitation, Western horsemanship and reining at more than 400 member colleges and universities. Members of IHSA participate at horse shows, regardless of their experience or financial status. Students compete at eight levels from beginner through advanced with provided horses, eliminating the expense of horse ownership. Founded in 1967 by Bob Cacchione, it is the oldest and largest intercollegiate equestrian organization with 10,000 members in 47 states and Canada. IHSA college and university team participation is represented through a variety of programs including varsity athletics, academic departments and club sports. IHSA offers hands-on experience and professional development in multiple facets of the equine industry. Many IHSA teams participate in service projects, giving back to their communities. 

An estimated 250,000 people have participated in the IHSA and it contributes a significant percentage of membership to the U.S. Hunter Jumper Association (USHJA), the U.S. Equestrian Federation (USEF), the American Quarter Horse Association (AQHA) and the National Reining Horse Association (NRHA).

Divisions
Within the IHSA, riders compete as individuals and teams in English riding (hunter seat equitation, aka, 'flat,' and over fences) or Western riding (Western horsemanship and reining). There are eight hunter seat levels total of nine classes including: Introductory, Pre-Novice, Novice, Limit on the flat and over fences, Intermediate on the flat and over fences, and Open on the flat and over fences. Alumni on the flat and Alumni over fences may also be offered.

For the Hunter Seat divisions, over fences, the Limit division jumps are set at 2’-2’3”, Intermediate jumps at 2’6”-2’9” and Open jumps at 2’9”-3’.  The Limit courses tend to be very straight forward while the Open courses require more challenging patterns such as bending lines or rollback turns.

In Western Horsemanship there are six levels: Beginner Western Horsemanship, Rookie A and B, Novice, Level I, Level II, Open and Open Reining. Alumni Horsemanship may be offered.

Judging
In both Hunter Seat and Western divisions, riders are judged on their equitation, i.e., each rider is individually judged on their effectiveness in communicating with their horse, while maintaining proper form. The best top competitors make their riding appear smooth and effortless.

IHSA shows are unlike open horse shows. An IHSA team organizes and hosts each show and invites other member colleges in its IHSA Region to compete. The show is usually at the host team's facility or nearby. Competitors are not permitted to ride their own horses. IHSA show horses are provided by host stables or "donated" for the day from other teams, coaches or area equestrian facilities. Each horse is schooled (warmed-up) before classes begin by non-competing riders, while student competitors observe to ascertain particular attributes of each potential horse. Each rider is assigned a horse, through random selection, called the "draw" and partially through a matching of the horse's abilities with those needed for horses participating in certain classes (for example, the more highly trained horses are used in the Open divisions, or a horse that doesn't jump would be put in a flat instead of an over fences class). The rider may or may not know anything about this horse, but the rider is expected to be able to ride any horse that is considered to be at the level that they are in. The rider mounts the horse he has been assigned just before his class is scheduled to begin. Competing riders are not permitted to warm-up their assigned horse except at the walk. One of the goals of the IHSA is to provide all riders with an equal chance of performing well in their class; by not allowing riders to compete on horses that they are comfortable with, judges can accurately rate the ability of the rider to effectively control the horse and ride well.

Individual ribbons correspond to points, which combine for a team score. Each team can have only one 'point rider' per division and the lowest score on their card is dropped. Thus larger teams do not get an advantage. A cumulative team score of 49 points for Hunter Seat or 42 points for Western would be a 'perfect' card. To keep divisions fair, a rider may only score a given number of points before they must graduate to another level of riding experience. 
Points correspond as follows:
General Points Awarded through the Zone/Semi-Final Level
 1st place: 7 points
 2nd place: 5 points
 3rd place: 4 points
 4th place: 3 points
 5th place: 2 points
 6th place: 1 point

Nationals Points Points will be counted as follows:

 First place  10 points
 Second place  8 points
 Third place   7 points
 Fourth place  6 points
 Fifth place   5 points
 Sixth place   4 points
 Seventh place 3 points
 Eighth place  2 points
 Ninth place   1 point
 Tenth place   1/2 point

To qualify for IHSA Regionals (the first step toward qualifying for the oldest and largest annual collegiate riding championships in America, the IHSA National Championships), a rider must accumulate a certain number of points. Once a rider has qualified for IHSA Regionals in a division, they must compete the rest of the year in the next division. The one exception are Introductory and Beginner divisions. However, a rider is only allowed to remain in the Introductory or Beginner division for two years before moving up to the next division.
IHSA Regional qualifiers then progress to IHSA Zone Championships, and Western Semi-Finals whose qualifiers then compete to represent their college or university at the IHSA National Championships.

Competition
With 400+ teams and more than 10,000 members, the IHSA divides the country into eight zones organized geographically. Every zone is divided into regions, and each region ranges with approximately five to 15 collegiate teams. The teams within the region compete against each other in two to ten horse shows per year. Each place (first through sixth) has an assigned point value that accumulates throughout the seasons. When riders acquire thirty-six (or twenty-eight for Open) points in their division, they qualify to compete in the Regional Finals competition. The top two riders in each class move on to compete in the Zone Finals and the top rider from Zones move on to Nationals. The high-point team (and in some zones, the top two teams) from each region also compete in Zones for the chance to represent their zone at the National Competition. At Nationals, both hunter seat and western teams come together to compete with teams from across the country.

Famous Alumni and Awards
IHSA has launched and nurtured the careers of some of America's greatest riders.  Its USEF/Cacchione Cup stars include U.S. Olympic Show Jumping medalists Greg Best, Beezie Madden, and Peter Wylde, as well as U.S. Combined Training champion Mark Weissbecker, and 2012 star of the History Channel's "Full Metal Jousting," James H. Fairclough, II.

The IHSA's founder, Robert E. Cacchione, has been recognized with the IHSA Lifetime Achievement Award, the USHJA Presidents Distinguished Service Award, 2011 US Equestrian/EQUUS Foundation Humanitarian Award, a Doctor of Humane Letters from Centenary College and the Zoetis/American Horse Publications Equine Industry Vision Award.

The IHSA official Facebook Page was recognized by the Equestrian Social Media Awards as a finalist and for the FEI Solidarity Award for best use of social media by a grassroots organization.

See also
OUEA

References

http://www.ihsainc.com/rules/rulebook

https://www.ihsainc.com/

https://www.charitynavigator.org/index.cfm?bay=search.profile&ein=472345589

https://www.guidestar.org/profile/47-2345589

External links
 

College sports governing bodies in the United States
Equestrian organizations